K. N. Kumarasamy Gounder is an Indian politician and former Member of the Legislative Assembly of Tamil Nadu. He was elected to the Tamil Nadu legislative assembly as a Praja Socialist Party candidate from Palladam constituency in 1967, and 1971 elections.

References 

Possibly living people
Praja Socialist Party politicians
Year of birth missing
Year of death missing
Tamil Nadu MLAs 1967–1972
Tamil Nadu MLAs 1971–1976